Two ships of the Royal Navy have been named HMS Musette:

, formerly French ship Musette (1781), captured in 1796 by HMS Hazard. Sold in 1806.
, formerly French brig Phaeton (1804), captured in 1806 and renamed HMS Mignonne, then in 1807 renamed HMS Musette. She was sold in 1814.

Royal Navy ship names